Stanley C. Soderland (March 15, 1917 – November 28, 2001) was a judge of the King County Superior Court, who clerked for Justice William O. Douglas of the U.S. Supreme Court.

Early life and education

Stanley Carl Soderland was born in Vancouver, British Columbia, to Carl and Irene Soderland. Stanley grew up on a farm near Snohomish, Washington. In 1936, he graduated from the University of Washington, and was made a member of Phi Beta Kappa. In 1939, Soderland received a LL.B. degree from the University of Washington School of Law, graduating first in his class. He served as the first full term clerk for Justice William O. Douglas of the U.S. Supreme Court from 1939 to 1940.

Legal career

Soderland practiced personal injury law in Seattle from 1943 to 1964.

In 1964, he was appointed a judge in King County Superior Court and served until his retirement in 1979. In 1971, he oversaw the grand jury led by prosecutors Chris Bayley and Evan Schwab investigating police payoffs, and helped lead an investigation into poor conditions at the King County Jail, which resulted in a report recommending reforms. Drawing on his years as a trial lawyer, also in 1971 he published pattern jury instructions for use in civil cases. In 1976, the Washington State Trial Lawyers Association voted him "Judge of the Year."

Family

He was married twice, and had one daughter, Diana Crittendon, and four sons, Stephen, Douglas, David and Carl. The family resided in the Laurelhurst neighborhood of Seattle, and had a second home on Shaw Island.

See also 
 List of law clerks of the Supreme Court of the United States (Seat 4)

References

1917 births
2001 deaths
University of Washington alumni
University of Washington School of Law alumni
People from Vancouver
Washington (state) state court judges
20th-century American judges
Lawyers from Seattle
Law clerks of the Supreme Court of the United States
American people of Canadian descent
Superior court judges in the United States
University of Michigan alumni
20th-century American lawyers
Canadian emigrants to the United States